Estonia, historically a Lutheran Christian nation, is today one of the "least religious" countries in the world in terms of declared attitudes, with only 14 percent of the population declaring religion to be an important part of their daily life.

The religious population is predominantly Christian and includes followers of 90 affiliations. According to the Estonian Council of Churches data from December 2019, 13.8 percent of the population belong to the Estonian Evangelical Lutheran Church, while 13.1 percent belong to the Estonian Orthodox Church of Moscow Patriarchate (EOCMP), and 2.3 percent belong to the Estonian Apostolic Orthodox Church. The Union of Free Evangelical and Baptist Churches of Estonia and the Roman Catholic Church in Estonia together comprise 1 percent of the population. Other Christian groups, including Jehovah’s Witnesses, Pentecostals, Methodists, Seventh-day Adventists, and Russian Old Believers, collectively constitute 1.1 percent of the population. According to Ringo Ringvee, "religion has never played an important role on the political or ideological battlefield" and the "tendencies that prevailed in the late 1930s for closer relations between the state and Lutheran church were ended with the Soviet occupation in 1940". He further states that "the chain of religious traditions was broken in most families" under the Soviet policy of state atheism. Before the Second World War, Estonia was approximately 80 per cent Protestant; overwhelmingly Lutheran, partly because of historic Swedish rule. Under Russian and Soviet rule, this predominance greatly decreased, while Eastern Orthodoxy increased due to immigration of Russians. 

Between 2001 and 2011 census, Eastern Orthodoxy overtook Lutheranism to become the largest Christian denomination in the country due to increasing lack of affiliation and very few conversions among Estonians, as well as due to steady or even increased religious affiliation among the Russian-speaking minorities. Lutheranism still remains the most popular religious group among ethnic Estonians (11 percent of them are Lutherans while also 2 percent of them are Orthodox), while Eastern Orthodoxy is practised mainly by the mostly non-indigenous Slavic minorities (approximately 45 per cent of them are Orthodox). According to the University of Tartu, irreligious Estonians are not necessarily atheists; instead, the years 2010s have witnessed a growth of Neopagan, Buddhist and Hindu beliefs among those who declare themselves to be "not religious".

History

Religious history 
In the 13th century, the Teutonic Knights brought Christianity to Estonia as part of the Livonian Crusade and during the Protestant Reformation, the Estonian Evangelical Lutheran Church became the established church. Before the Second World War, Estonia was approximately 80% Protestant; overwhelmingly Lutheran, with individuals adhering to Calvinism, as well as other Protestant branches. Robert T. Francoeur and Raymond J. Noonan write that "In 1925, the church was separated from the state, but religious instruction remained in the schools and clergymen were trained at the Faculty of Theology at Tartu University. With the Soviet occupation and the implementation of anti-Christian legislation, the church lost over two thirds of its clergy. Work with children, youth, publishing, and so on, was banned, church property was nationalized, and the Faculty of Theology was closed." Aldis Purs, a professor of history at the University of Toronto writes that in Estonia, as well as Latvia, some evangelical Christian clergy attempted to resist the Soviet policy of state atheism by engaging in anti-regime activities such as Bible smuggling. The text titled World and Its Peoples: Estonia, Latvia, Lithuania, and Poland, published by the Marshall Cavendish, states that in addition to the Soviet antireligious campaign in Estonia, which mandated the confiscation of church property and deportation of theologians to Siberia, many "churches were destroyed in the German occupation of Estonia, from 1941 through 1944, and in World War II (1939-1945)". After the dissolution of the Soviet Union, this antireligious legislation was annulled.

Modern Estonian Christian theology often revolves around religious rituals rather than trying to preach to or convert Estonians. Christian religious workers often play an important social role in some towns.

Orthodox Christianity 
There were two Orthodox Christian Churches in Estonia – the Estonian Orthodox Church, which was part of the Moscow Patriarchate, and the Estonian Apostolic Orthodox Church under Constantinople. The Estonian Ecumenical Patriarchate of Constantinople is a small group which is barely heard of outside Estonia. The membership of the Apostolic Orthodox was about 30,000 in 1996.  Since 1840 many Lutherans converted to Orthodox Christianity which resulted in the rise of the Orthodox in Estonia. In 1920, the Apostolic Orthodox Church became autonomous from the Russian Patriarch Tikhon. The reoccupation of Estonia state by the Soviet Union ended the autonomy of the Estonian Apostolic Orthodox Church however, the autonomy was regained in 1996 after Estonia regained her independence under the Soviet Union.  The number of the Estonian Apostolic Orthodox Church during the Soviet era was about 200,000 out of which 80% were native Estonians.

The division between the two Orthodox Christian churches in Estonia is relative.  The Estonian Apostolic Orthodox is dominated by ethnic Estonians whereas the majority of the Estonian Orthodox Church are ethnic Russians. The communication and cooperation between the believers of the two Orthodox communities in Estonia is a social practice and occurs at the individual level.
Religion plays major role in the lives of people. Many people find solace in what they believe in. People believe in many different things. However, the belief in a supreme being is common among religious believers. Christians do believe there is God who created the universe and human beings. They also believe in Jesus Christ as the son of God who came to save mankind from our sins. Estonia is not different from the people described above. Some believe in God as the Supreme being while others believe there is no God. A research by Tom Esslemon in 2011 revealed that fewer than one in  five Estonians claim plays an important role in their lives.  According to the 2000 Estonian census, 29% of the total population belonged to some religion An Eurobarometer poll in 2005 claimed only 16% of Estonians believe in God however, 54% believed in some sort of spirit or life force.

Protestantism

Pentecostalism 
Religious revivals from the 1870s culminated in Pentecostal movements in Estonia. Foreign missionaries from Sweden and Finland brought full fledged Pentecostalism to Estonia in the 1920s. In 1873, the Swedish Evangelical society, the Evangelical Homeland Foundation sent missionaries to Estonia at the request of the Lutheran clergy of the Coastal Swedes. These missionaries, Thure Emmanuel Thoren and Lars Osterblom started the revival among the coastal Swedes. The Revivalists broke from the Lutheran Church in 1880. The revival movement had spread to Western Estonia and they were called Ridala in 1879. The revival brought more charismatic activities such as jumping, clapping, dancing and speaking in tongues. In the later part of the 1960s, the activities of the Finnish missionaries brought charismatic Pentecostal revival in the evangelical Christian Churches and the Baptist in Tallinn. The healing ministry in the 1970s has had a great impact on the charismatic movement in the Soviet Union.

The Estonian Christian Pentecostal Church is the biggest Pentecostal Church in Estonia. It was started in 1989.  There are also the Association of Estonian Evangelical Christian Pentecostal congregations, the Association of Estonian Christian Free Churches and many other independent churches.  There seems to be little written history about the Pentecostal and charismatic Christianity in Estonia. Most of what is known about Pentecostal and charismatic Christianity comes from the memoirs of Evald Kiil (1997) who began his profession as a Pentecostal preacher in the 1930s. It is estimated that in the 1930s there were about 200 to 2000 Pentecostals in Estonia. The 1934 population census of Estonia indicates there were 191 people were Pentecostals, 459 were Free Gospel Churches and 306 were Revivalists. The 2011 population census of Estonia puts the total number of people belonging to Charismatic and Pentecostal Churches to about 5,256.

Baptists, Methodists, Moravians 
In 1884, the German Baptist pastor Adam Schiewe performed the first baptism of faith in Estonia. The Baptist church became one of the fastest growing churches in the years that followed. The Seventh-Day Adventists started in 1897. The Methodist movement has been present in Estonia since 1907. Currently the Estonian Methodists operate as the United Methodist Church in Estonia. The arrival of the Moravian Movement in the first half of the 18th century laid the spiritual foundation for the revivals that followed.

Demographics

Less than a third of the population define themselves as believers; of those most are Eastern Orthodox, predominantly, but not exclusively, among the Slavic minorities, or Lutheran. There are also a number of smaller Muslim, Protestant, Jewish, and Buddhist groups. The organisation Maavalla Koda unites adherents of animist traditional religions (Estonian Neopaganism). The Russian Rodnover organisation "Vene Rahvausu Kogudus Eestis" is registered in Tartu.

Census statistics, 2000–2021

Line chart of the trends, 2000–2021
Census statistics 2000–2021:

Religions by ethnic group

In census are included people aged 15 and over. The percentage is calculated from the number of respondents (excluded refused/unknown numbers).

Other surveys
 The Eurobarometer Poll 2010 found that 18% of the Estonian population responded that "they believe there is a God", 50% responded that "they believe there is some sort of spirit or life force" and 29% responded that "they don't believe there is any sort of spirit, God or life force". 3% gave no response. In 2015 the same survey found that 58.6% of the Estonians regarded themselves as Christians, divided between 23.2% who were Eastern Orthodox, 9.0% Protestants, 2.8% Catholics and 23.6%  other Christians. The unaffiliated people made up 38.8% of the respondents and were divided between atheists who were 22.2% and agnostics who were 16.6%.
 A 2006–2008 survey held by Gallup showed that 14% of Estonians answered positively to the question: "Is religion an important part of your daily life?", which was the lowest among 143 countries polled.
 A 2015 Pew Research Center survey found that 51% of the population of Estonia declared to be Christians, 45% irreligious—a category which includes atheists, agnostics and those who answered that they believed in "nothing in particular", while 2% belonged to other faiths. The Christians were divided between 25% who were Eastern Orthodox, 20% Lutherans, 5% other Christians and 1% Catholic. The irreligious people divided between 9% who were atheists, 1% who were agnostics, and 35% who answered "nothing in particular".
 The International Social Survey Programme 2015 found that 57.0% of the Estonian population declared to belong to a Christian denomination, divided between a 27.6% who were Eastern Orthodox, 26.0% Lutheran and 3.3% who belonged to smaller Christian denominations. Only 38.9% declared to have no religion.
 In 2018, according to a study jointly conducted by London's St Mary's University's Benedict XVI Centre for Religion and Society and the Institut Catholique de Paris, and based on data from the European Social Survey 2014–2016, among the 16 to 29 years-old Estonians 19% were Christians (13% Orthodox, 3% Protestant, 1% Catholic and 1% other Christian denominations) and 80% were not religious.

See also 

 Catholic Church in Estonia
 Eastern Orthodoxy in Estonia
 United Methodist Church in Estonia
 Hinduism in Estonia
 History of the Jews in Estonia
 Islam in Estonia
 List of churches in Estonia
 List of cathedrals in Estonia

References